Dahira plutenkoi is a moth of the family Sphingidae. It is known from Sichuan in China, where it occurs at between 2,600 and 3,200 meters altitude.

References

plutenkoi
Moths described in 2002
Endemic fauna of Sichuan
Moths of Asia